HMAS Geelong (J201), named for the city of Geelong, Victoria, was one of 60 Bathurst-class corvettes constructed during World War II, and one of 36 initially manned and commissioned solely by the Royal Australian Navy (RAN).

Geelong was lost after a collision on 18 October 1944. She was one of only three Bathurst class corvettes lost during World War II.

Design and construction

In 1938, the Australian Commonwealth Naval Board (ACNB) identified the need for a general purpose 'local defence vessel' capable of both anti-submarine and mine-warfare duties, while easy to construct and operate. Construction of the prototype  did not go ahead, but the plans were retained. The need for locally built 'all-rounder' vessels at the start of World War II saw the "Australian Minesweepers" (designated as such to hide their anti-submarine capability, but popularly referred to as "corvettes") approved in September 1939, with 60 constructed during the course of the war: 36 (including Geelong) ordered by the RAN, 20 ordered by the British Admiralty but manned and commissioned as RAN vessels, and 4 for the Royal Indian Navy.

Geelong was laid down by HMA Naval Dockyard at Williamstown, Victoria on 16 October 1940. She was launched on 22 April 1941 by the wife of Lord Winston Dugan, then Governor of Victoria, and was commissioned into the RAN on 16 January 1942.

Operational history
After commissioning, Geelong visited her namesake city before undergoing working up trials. On completion, the corvette was assigned as a minesweeper and anti-submarine patrol ship along the east coast of Australia, before being redeployed to New Caledonia on 8 March 1942 to perform similar duties. In May 1942, Geelong returned Sydney, and was one of several Allied vessels located in Sydney Harbour during the Japanese midget submarine attack of 31 May 1942. In June, the ship began convoy escort runs between Sydney and Brisbane, which continued until January 1944, when she sailed to Adelaide for a two-month refit.

After the refit, Geelong briefly operated in Australian waters before being assigned to New Guinea. Using Milne Bay as a base of operations, the corvette served as a convoy escort and anti-submarine patrol ship throughout the South West Pacific Area.

Fate
There were no deaths, with the survivors picked up by York and transported to Langemak.

Geelong was one of only three Bathurst class ships to be lost during World War II, and one of two lost to collision.

The ship received two battle honours for her wartime service: "Pacific 1942–44" and "New Guinea 1944".

Citations

References
Books

Journal and news articles

Bathurst-class corvettes of the Royal Australian Navy
Ships built in Victoria (Australia)
1941 ships
World War II corvettes of Australia
World War II shipwrecks in the Pacific Ocean
Maritime incidents in October 1944
Ships sunk in collisions